Anna Larsson may refer to:

Anna Larsson (contralto) (born 1966), Swedish contralto
Anna Larsson (athlete) (1922–2003), Swedish runner and skier
Anna Larsson (rugby union) (born 1975), Swedish rugby union player